= Amnista =

Town of ancient Caria

Coordinates: 36°56′44″N 28°11′07″E

Amnista was a town of ancient Caria. Its name does not appear in ancient authors but is inferred from inscriptions.

Its site is located near Söğüt, Asiatic Turkey.
